Senator Lloyd may refer to:

Members of the United States Senate
Edward Lloyd (Governor of Maryland) (1779–1834), U.S. Senator from Maryland from 1819 to 1826
James Lloyd (Maryland politician) (1745–1830), U.S. Senator from Maryland from 1797 to 1800
James Lloyd (Massachusetts politician) (1769–1831), U.S. Senator from Massachusetts from 1808 to 1813

United States state senate members
Henry Lloyd (governor) (1852–1920), Maryland State Senate
James R. Lloyd (1950–1989), Pennsylvania State Senate
Sherman P. Lloyd (1914–1979), Utah State Senate

See also
Jean Hall Lloyd-Jones (born 1929), Iowa State Senate